The Hammer of God may refer to:

Literature 
The Hammer of God (Clarke novel), a 1993 novel by Arthur C. Clarke
"The Hammer of God" (short story), a short story by G. K. Chesterton, c. 1911
The Hammer of God (DeMille novel), a 1974 novel by Nelson DeMille
The Hammer of God (Bo Giertz novel), a 1941 novel by Bishop Bo Giertz
Hammer of God (Miller novel), a 2009 novel by Karen Miller

Other 
Hammer of God (album), a 1999 album by Mortification
"The Hammer of God", a nickname for baseball player Mariano Rivera
The Hammer of God, an alternate title for the 1970 film The Chinese Boxer

See also
Hammer of the Gods (disambiguation)